Beijer Electronics is a Swedish company that designs and manufactures human machine interface terminals and automation software. The company is based in Malmö, with presence in Europe, Asia and Americas with own offices and through distribution. Beijer Electronics’ products are marketed under their company name and the brand names Westermo and Korenix. Operations are carried out under two business areas: IAS (Industrial Automation Solutions) and IDC (Industrial Data Communication).

History 
Beijer Electronics began in 1981 in Malmö, Sweden, but has grown to have a presence in offices outside of the country as well. The company is listed on the NASDAQ OMX Nordic Exchange Stockholm's Small Cap list under the ticker BELE.

In October 2019, Beijer Electronics acquired Irish company Virtual Access Limited.

Technology 
The products by Beijer Electronics include operator panels, industrial PCs, and automation software (WARP, iX, Information Designer, H-Designer, E-Designer, ADP, and Qlarity).

Segments and industries 
General industrial automation and data communication is Beijer Electronics largest market segment, exemplified by the manufacturing industry which mainly uses standard products. Other segments include marine and offshore, train, oil and gas, industrial factory automation and security and surveillance.

References 

Information technology companies of Sweden
Manufacturing companies of Sweden
Companies based in Malmö